This article contains lists of various statistics on the United States men's national water polo team at the Summer Olympics. The lists are updated as of March 30, 2020.

Abbreviations

Basics
Men's water polo tournaments have been staged at the Olympic Games since 1900. The United States has participated in 22 of 27 tournaments. The United States team is the only non-European squad to win medals in the men's Olympic water polo tournament.

Best results:
 1st place ( Gold medal):
  1904 St. Louis (demonstration event)
 2nd place ( Silver medal):
  1904 St. Louis (demonstration event)
  1984 Los Angeles
  1988 Seoul
  2008 Beijing
 3rd place ( Bronze medal):
  1904 St. Louis (demonstration event)
  1924 Paris
  1932 Los Angeles
  1972 Munich

Latest medal:
  Silver medal (2nd place):  2008 Beijing

Team

Results

By tournament

The following table shows results of the United States men's national water polo team at the Olympic Games by tournament.

Historical progression – best finish

The following table shows the historical progression of the best finish at the Olympic Games.

By opponent

The following tables show results of the United States men's national water polo team at the Olympic Games by opponent.

^Teams that have won at least one Olympic medal are shown in bold.
†Defunct teams are shown in italic.

Victories, ties and defeats

 Biggest victory in an Olympic match

 Heaviest defeat in an Olympic match

 Most victories in an Olympic tournament
 6, 1972 Summer Olympics
 6, 1984 Summer Olympics

 Most matches without defeat in an Olympic tournament
 8, 1972 Summer Olympics

 Most defeats in an Olympic tournament
 5, 2000 Summer Olympics
 5, 2012 Summer Olympics

 Most matches without victory in an Olympic tournament
 5, 2000 Summer Olympics
 5, 2012 Summer Olympics

 Most ties in an Olympic tournament
 2, 1972 Summer Olympics

 Most matches without a tie in an Olympic tournament
 9, 1952 Summer Olympics

Goals for and against

 Most goals for in an Olympic match

 Least goals for in an Olympic match

 Most goals against in an Olympic match

 Least goals against in an Olympic match

 Most matches scoring in an Olympic tournament
 9, 1972 Summer Olympics

 Most matches without scoring in an Olympic tournament
 1, 1928 Summer Olympics
 1, 1932 Summer Olympics
 1, 1948 Summer Olympics
 1, 1952 Summer Olympics

 Most matches conceding a goal in an Olympic tournament
 9, 1952 Summer Olympics
 9, 1972 Summer Olympics

Rosters

Number of competitors and average age, height & weight
The following table shows number of competitors and average age, height & weight at the Olympic Games by tournament.

Historical progression – returning Olympians
The following table shows the historical progression of the record of returning Olympians.

Historical progression – average age, height and weight
The following table shows the historical progression of the record of average age at the Olympic Games.

The following table shows the historical progression of the record of average height at the Olympic Games.

The following table shows the historical progression of the record of average weight at the Olympic Games.

Individual

Appearances

Most appearances

The following tables are pre-sorted by number of Olympic appearances (in descending order), date of the last Olympic appearance (in ascending order), date of the first Olympic appearance (in ascending order), name of the person (in ascending order), respectively.

Sixteen athletes have each made at least three Olympic appearances. Tony Azevedo is the first and only American water polo player (man or woman) to have competed in five Olympic Games (2000–2016).

Six men have each made two Olympic appearances as head coaches of the United States men's national team.

Four Americans have each made Olympic appearances as players and as head coaches of the United States men's national team.

Historical progression – appearances of players
The following table shows the historical progression of appearances of players at the Olympic Games.

Matches played

Players with at least 20 matches played at the Olympics

The following table is pre-sorted by number of total matches played (in descending order), edition of the Olympics (in ascending order), name of the player (in ascending order), respectively.

Tony Azevedo is the American water polo player with the most matches played at the Olympic Games.

Historical progression – total matches played
The following table shows the historical progression of the record of total matches played at the Olympic Games.

Players with at least 9 matches played in an Olympic tournament

Scorers

Players with at least 15 goals at the Olympics

The following table is pre-sorted by number of total goals (in descending order), number of total matches played (in ascending order), edition of the Olympics (in ascending order), name of the player (in ascending order), respectively.

Tony Azevedo is the top scorer of all time for the United States men's Olympic water polo team, with 61 goals.

As a left-hander, Chris Humbert is the American water polo player with the second most goals at the Olympic Games, scoring 37.

Historical progression – total goals at the Olympics
The following table shows the historical progression of the record of total goals at the Olympic Games.

Players with at least 10 goals in an Olympic tournament

The following table is pre-sorted by number of goals (in descending order), number of matches played (in ascending order), edition of the Olympics (in ascending order), name of the player (in ascending order), respectively.

Bruce Bradley is the American male player with the most goals in an Olympic tournament, scoring 18.

Historical progression – goals in an Olympic tournament
The following table shows the historical progression of the record of goals in an Olympic tournament.

Top scorers for each Olympic tournament

The following table shows the top scorers with at least five goals for each Olympic tournament, and is pre-sorted by edition of the Olympics (in ascending order), number of goals (in descending order), Cap number or name of the player (in ascending order), respectively.

Chris Humbert is the first and only American male player to have been the team-leading scorer for three Olympic tournaments (1992–2000).

Players with at least 4 goals in an Olympic match

The following table is pre-sorted by number of goals (in descending order), date of the match (in ascending order), name of the player (in ascending order), respectively.

In water polo, if a player scores three times in a game, a hat-trick is made. Thirty-two American athletes have each made at least one hat-trick in an Olympic match.

Tony Azevedo is the American water polo player with the most hat-tricks made at the Olympic Games, scoring 11.

Bruce Bradley and Chris Humbert are the joint American male players with the second most hat-tricks made at the Olympic Games, scoring 6.

Goalkeepers

Starting goalkeepers

The following table is pre-sorted by edition of the Olympics (in ascending order), number of matches played (in descending order), Cap number or name of the player (in ascending order), respectively.

Craig Wilson is the first starting goalkeeper for the United States men's national team to have competed in three Olympic Games (1984–1992). He is the only starting goalkeeper to have won two Olympic medals (1984 , 1988 ).

Most appearances of goalkeepers

The following table is pre-sorted by number of Olympic appearances (in descending order), date of the last Olympic appearance (in ascending order), date of the first Olympic appearance (in ascending order), name of the goalkeeper (in ascending order), respectively.

Ten American goalkeepers have each made at least two Olympic appearances.

Historical progression – appearances of goalkeepers

The following table shows the historical progression of appearances of goalkeepers at the Olympic Games.

Goalkeepers with at least 10 matches played at the Olympics

The following table is pre-sorted by number of total matches played (in descending order), edition of the Olympics (in ascending order), name of the goalkeeper (in ascending order), respectively.

Craig Wilson is the American goalkeeper with the most matches played at the Olympic Games.

Historical progression – total matches played by goalkeepers

The following table shows the historical progression of the record of total matches played by goalkeepers at the Olympic Games.

Goalkeepers with at least 8 matches played in an Olympic tournament

Shots saved and efficiency

Medalists

Multiple Olympic medalists in water polo

The following table is pre-sorted by number of Olympic medals (in descending order), type of the Olympic medal (in descending order), date of receiving an Olympic medal (in ascending order), name of the person (in ascending order), respectively.

Six American athletes have each won two Olympic medals in water polo. Aside from Wally O'Connor, who won medals before World War II, all were members of the men's national team that won consecutive silver medals in 1984 and 1988.

Monte Nitzkowski is the first and only man to have won two Olympic medals as the head coach of the United States men's national team.

Terry Schroeder is the first and only American (man or woman) to have won medals in the Olympic water polo tournaments both as a player and as a head coach.

Multiple Olympic medalists in water polo and swimming

The following table is pre-sorted by number of Olympic medals (in descending order), type of the Olympic medal (in descending order), date of the Olympic water polo tournament (in ascending order), name of the player (in ascending order), respectively.

Five American athletes have won Olympic medals in water polo and swimming.

As a member of the 1924 and 1928 U.S. Olympic water polo team, Johnny Weissmuller won five Olympic gold medals in swimming and one bronze medal in water polo.

Tim Shaw is the only American athlete to have won Olympic medals in water polo and swimming after World War II.

Swimming Olympic medalists without an Olympic medal in water polo

The following table is pre-sorted by number of Olympic medals (in descending order), type of the Olympic medal (in descending order), date of the Olympic water polo tournament (in ascending order), name of the player (in ascending order), respectively.

Aside from five athletes above, another five American water polo players have won Olympic medals in swimming.

Among the ten athletes, Brad Schumacher is the only American player to have competed in an Olympic water polo tournament since 2000.

Head coaches
Monte Nitzkowski is the first and only coach to lead the United States men's national team to have won two Olympic medals (1972 , 1984 ).

*Qualified but withdrew.

Historical progression – appearances of head coaches

The following table shows the historical progression of appearances of head coaches at the Olympic Games.

Captains
Terry Schroeder and Tony Azevedo are the only two American water polo players (men or women) to have each captained in three Olympic tournaments.

*Qualified but withdrew.

Historical progression – appearances of captains
The following table shows the historical progression of appearances of captains at the Olympic Games.

Sprinters
The following table shows the players with at least three sprints for each Olympic tournament (2000–2016), and is pre-sorted by edition of the Olympics (in ascending order), number of sprints (in descending order), number of matches played (in descending order), Cap number or name of the player (in ascending order), respectively.

Sprinters are usually the fastest swimmers of the water polo team. If a water polo player won an Olympic medal in swimming, he would be an outstanding sprinter.

Brad Schumacher is the latest example. He won two gold medals for the United States at the 1996 Atlanta Olympics: in the men's 4×100 meter freestyle relay and in the men's 4×200 meter freestyle relay. At the 2000 Sydney Olympics, he was the top sprinter of the men's water polo tournament.

Left-handed players
Most water polo players are right-handed. Skilled left-handed players are very valuable, because they can get special angles that right-handed players can not get. Left-handed drivers (attackers) are usually on the right side of the field. With right-handed drivers on the left side of the field, left-handed drivers allow their teams to launch two-sided attacks.

As a left-handed center (2-meter man), Chris Humbert is the American male player with the second most goals at the Olympic Games.

Kevin Robertson is one of the smallest but quickest player in American water polo history. As a left-handed driver (attacker), he is the American male player with the ninth most goals at the Olympic Games, and he is the first and only American male left-hander to have won two Olympic medals in water polo.

*Qualified but withdrew.

Miscellaneous

Age records

Top 10 oldest players

The following table is pre-sorted by age of the last Olympic appearance (in descending order), date of the last Olympic appearance (in ascending order), Cap number or name of the player (in ascending order), respectively.

Top 10 oldest Olympic debutants

The following table is pre-sorted by age of the first Olympic appearance (in descending order), date of the first Olympic appearance (in ascending order), Cap number or name of the player (in ascending order), respectively.

Top 10 youngest players (Olympic debutants)

The following table is pre-sorted by age of the first Olympic appearance (in ascending order), date of the first Olympic appearance (in ascending order), Cap number or name of the player (in ascending order), respectively.

Top 10 oldest Olympic medalists

The following table is pre-sorted by age of receiving an Olympic medal (in descending order), date of receiving an Olympic medal (in ascending order), Cap number or name of the player (in ascending order), respectively.

Top 10 youngest Olympic medalists

The following table is pre-sorted by age of receiving an Olympic medal (in ascending order), date of receiving an Olympic medal (in ascending order), Cap number or name of the player (in ascending order), respectively.

Physical records

Top 10 tallest players

The following table is pre-sorted by height of the player (in descending order), edition of the Olympics (in ascending order), name of the player (in ascending order), respectively.

Top 10 shortest players

The following table is pre-sorted by height of the player (in ascending order), edition of the Olympics (in ascending order), name of the player (in ascending order), respectively.

*Qualified but withdrew.

Top 10 heaviest players

The following table is pre-sorted by maximum weight of the player (in descending order), edition of the Olympics (in ascending order), name of the player (in ascending order), respectively.

Top 10 lightest players

The following table is pre-sorted by minimum weight of the player (in descending order), edition of the Olympics (in ascending order), name of the player (in ascending order), respectively.

*Qualified but withdrew.

Birthplaces

Players born outside the United States

The following table is pre-sorted by edition of the Olympics (in ascending order), Cap number or name of the player (in ascending order), respectively.

Twelve players were born outside the United States, in four continents (Asia, Europe, North America, and South America).

*Qualified but withdrew.

Colleges

The following table is pre-sorted by number of times of players (in descending order), number of Olympic medals (in descending order), number of editions of the Olympics (in descending order), edition of the Olympics (in ascending order), name of the college (in ascending order), respectively.

Most athletes played collegiate water polo, many of them were NCAA Champions. The graduates from seven colleges in California (Long Beach State, Pepperdine, Stanford, UC Berkeley, UC Irvine, UCLA, and USC) have gone on to be the major part of the United States men's water polo Olympic team.

*Qualified but withdrew.

Water polo families

Brothers
The three McIlroy brothers (Paul, Chick and Ned) were all members of the 1964 United States men's Olympic water polo team.

The Kooistra brothers (Bill and Sam) played for the United States in water polo at the 1956 Olympics. Jeff Campbell competed alongside his elder brother, Peter, at the 1988 Olympics.

*Qualified but withdrew.

Tony van Dorp, a Dutch-American goalkeeper, competed in the 1964 and 1968 Summer Olympics for the United States. His younger brother, Fred, was a Dutch field player, and played against his brother at the 1964 and 1968 Olympics.

Father-son

Father-daughter

Hall of Fame inductees

See also
 United States men's Olympic water polo team statistics (appearances)
 United States men's Olympic water polo team statistics (matches played)
 United States men's Olympic water polo team statistics (scorers)
 United States men's Olympic water polo team statistics (goalkeepers)
 United States men's Olympic water polo team statistics (medalists)
 United States men's Olympic water polo team results
 List of United States men's Olympic water polo team rosters
 United States men's national water polo team

Notes

References

External links
 Official website

Men's Olympic statistics 0
Olympic men's statistics 0
Olympic water polo team records and statistics